The 2007 Christchurch mayoral election was part of the 2007 New Zealand local elections. On 13 October of that year, elections were held for the Mayor of Christchurch plus other local government roles. Incumbent Garry Moore retired in 2007 after nine years in the office. Bob Parker, previously mayor of Banks Peninsula, beat the Christchurch 2021 representative, Megan Woods, with a majority of 14,212 votes (13.73%). Media personality Jo Giles, who had previously contested the  electorate for the ACT Party for Parliament, came a distant third. A further seven candidate contested the election.

Results

Voting statistics
Participation in local elections has been falling for years. In the 2007 local election, 40.81% of registered voters cast their vote, some two percentage points higher than in 2004. The following table shows the voting statistics since the 1989 local elections:

References

Mayoral elections in Christchurch
2007 elections in New Zealand
Politics of Christchurch
2000s in Christchurch
October 2007 events in New Zealand